A gerontocracy is a form of oligarchical rule in which an entity is ruled by leaders who are significantly older than most of the adult population. In many political structures, power within the ruling class accumulates with age, making the oldest individuals the holders of the most power. Those holding the most power may not be in formal leadership positions, but often dominate those who are. In a simplified definition, a gerontocracy is a society where leadership is reserved for elders.

Although the idea of the elderly holding power exists in many cultures, the gerontocracy has its western roots in ancient Greece. Plato famously stated that "it is for the elder man to rule and for the younger to submit". One example of the ancient Greek gerontocracy can be seen in the city state of Sparta, which was ruled by a Gerousia, a council made up of members who were at least 60 years old and who served for life.

In political systems
Elders had leadership roles in many tribal societies. In the time of the Eight Immortals of the Chinese Communist Party, it was quipped, "the 80-year-olds are calling meetings of 70-year-olds to decide which 60-year-olds should retire". For instance, Party chairman Mao Zedong was 82 when he died, while Deng Xiaoping was not retired until the age of 85.

In the Soviet Union
In the Soviet Union, gerontocracy became increasingly entrenched starting in the 1970s; it was prevalent in the country until at least March 1985, when a more dynamic and younger, ambitious leadership headed by Mikhail Gorbachev took power. Leonid Brezhnev, its foremost representative, died in 1982 aged 75, but had suffered a heart attack in 1975, after which generalized arteriosclerosis set in, so that he was progressively infirm and had trouble speaking. During his last two years he was essentially a figurehead.

In 1980, the average Politburo member — generally a young survivor of the Great Purge who raised to power in the 1930s and 1940s — was 70 years old (as opposed to 55 in 1952 and 61 in 1964), and by 1982, Brezhnev's Minister of Foreign Affairs Andrei Gromyko, his Minister of Defense Dmitriy Ustinov and his Premier Nikolai Tikhonov were all in their mid-to-late seventies. Yuri Andropov, Brezhnev's 68-year-old successor, was seriously ill with kidney disease when he took over, and after his death fifteen months later, he was succeeded by Konstantin Chernenko, then 72, who lasted thirteen months before his death and replacement with Gorbachev. Chernenko became the third Soviet leader to die in less than three years, and, upon being informed in the middle of the night of his death, U.S. President Ronald Reagan, who was seven months older than Chernenko and just over three years older than his predecessor Andropov, is reported to have remarked, "How am I supposed to get anyplace with the Russians if they keep dying on me?"

Communist states
Other Communist countries with leaders in their 70s or 80s have included Albania (First Secretary Enver Hoxha was 76 at death), Bulgaria (General Secretary Todor Zhivkov was 78 at his resignation), Czechoslovakia (President Gustáv Husák was 76 at his resignation), China (Chairman Mao Zedong was 82 at death), East Germany (General Secretary and head of state Erich Honecker was 77 when forced out), Hungary (General Secretary János Kádár was 75 when forced out), Laos (President Kaysone Phomvihane was 71 at death), North Korea (Supreme Leader Kim Il-sung was 82 at death), Romania (General Secretary and Conducător Nicolae Ceauşescu was 71 when he was executed), Vietnam (General Secretary Lê Duẩn was 79 at death), Yugoslavia (President and Marshall Josip Broz Tito was 87 at death). On the sub-national level, Georgia's Party head Vasil Mzhavanadze was 70 when forced out, and his Lithuanian counterpart Antanas Sniečkus was 71 at death. Nowadays, Cuba has been characterized as a gerontocracy: "Although the population is now mainly black or mulatto and young, its rulers form a mainly white gerontocracy", The Economist wrote in 2008. Cuba's Fidel Castro had de facto ruled the country for nearly 50 years, effectively retiring in 2008 at the age of 82, although he remained the leader of the Communist Party of Cuba until 2011. He was replaced by his brother Raúl Castro, who was 89 years old at the time of his own retirement.

United States

In 2021, the average age of a U.S. senator was 64, and positions of power within the legislatures – such as chairmanships of various committees – are usually bestowed upon the more experienced, that is, older, members of the legislature. Strom Thurmond, a U.S. senator from South Carolina, left office at age 100 after almost half a century in the body, while Robert Byrd of West Virginia was born in 1917 and served in the Senate from 1959 to his death in 2010. Both Thurmond and Byrd had served as President pro tempore of the Senate, a position that is third in the United States presidential line of succession. Senators under the age of 40 are virtually unknown.

Under Presidents Donald Trump and Joe Biden, the United States government has been described as a gerontocracy. At 70, Trump was the oldest person ever to be inaugurated president of the United States, until the inauguration of Biden. Many senior officials in Trump's administration, such as Attorneys General Jeff Sessions and William Barr, Secretary of Agriculture Sonny Perdue, and Commerce Secretary Wilbur Ross, have been 70 or older.

In the 2020 presidential election, Biden prevailed against Trump, setting a new age record. Biden was 78 when he was sworn in on 20 January 2021, making him the oldest person to be inaugurated president of the United States. The Biden administration's cabinet appointments have also reflected these gerontocratic tendencies. The Democratic Speaker of the House Nancy Pelosi, and the Republican Senate Minority Leader Mitch McConnell, are also both the oldest holders of their offices in American history.

This observation has been connected to broader themes of American decline.

Theocracy
Gerontocracy is common in theocratic states and religious organizations such as Iran, Saudi Arabia, the Vatican and the Church of Jesus Christ of Latter-day Saints, in which leadership is concentrated in the hands of religious elders. Despite the age of the senior religious leaders, however, parliamentary candidates in Iran must be under 75. Nominally a theocratic monarchy, Saudi Arabia, likened to various late communist states, has been ruled by gerontocrats. Aged king Saud and his aged relatives held rule along with many elder clerics. They were in their eighties (born c. 1930). Recently, however, power has become concentrated by Mohammad bin Salman–31 years old when, by the king, he was appointed Crown Prince of Saudi Arabia (assuming 'office' 21 June 2017)–who has sidelined powerful, older members of the Saudi family.

Stateless societies
In Kenya, Samburu society is said to be a gerontocracy. The power of elders is linked to the belief in their curse, underpinning their monopoly over arranging marriages and taking on further wives. This is at the expense of unmarried younger men, whose development up to the age of thirty is in a state of social suspension, prolonging their adolescent status. The paradox of Samburu gerontocracy is that popular attention focuses on the glamour and deviant activities of these footloose bachelors, which extend to a form of gang warfare, widespread suspicions of adultery with the wives of older men, and theft of their stock.

African societies such as this are known for their gerontocratic hierarchies. The Yoruba people, for example, are led by titled elders known as Obas and Oloyes. Although not an explicit requirement, most of them are decidedly elderly due to a variety of factors.

Other countries
The Roman Republic was originally an example; the word senate is related to the Latin word senex, meaning "old man". Cicero wrote: "They wouldn't make use of running or jumping or spears from afar or swords up close, but rather wisdom, reasoning, and thought, which, if they weren't in old men, our ancestors wouldn't have called the highest council the senate."

In the Indian state of Tamil Nadu, the government headed by M. Karunanidhi the state's chief minister who was 87 years old, was another real-world example of gerontocracy. In another Indian state, West Bengal, Shri Jyoti Basu, was 86 years old when he stepped down from the office of chief minister of the state. But he continued to remain a member of the Politburo of the Communist Party of India (Marxist) until a few months before his death in January 2010 and was consulted on all matters related to governance by the Chief Minister and his Cabinet as well as his other party colleagues.

Present-day Italy is often considered a gerontocracy, even in the internal Italian debate. The Monti government had the highest average age in the western world (64 years), with its youngest members being 57. Former Italian prime minister Mario Monti was 70 when he left office, his immediate predecessor Silvio Berlusconi was 75 at the time of resignation (2011), the previous head of the government Romano Prodi was 70 when he stepped down (2008). In 2013, the youngest among the candidates for prime minister (Pier Luigi Bersani) was 62, the others being 70 and 78. The current average age of Italian university professors is 63, of bank directors and CEOs 67, of members of parliament 56, of labor union representatives 59.

Organizational examples

Outside the political sphere, gerontocracy may be observed in other institutional hierarchies of various kinds. Generally the mark of a gerontocracy is the presence of a substantial number of septuagenarian or octogenarian leaders—those younger than this are too young for the label to be appropriate, while those older than this have generally been too few in number to dominate the leadership. The rare centenarian who has retained a position of power is generally by far the oldest in the hierarchy.

Gerontocracy generally occurs as a phase in the development of an entity, rather than being part of it throughout its existence. Opposition to gerontocracy may cause weakening or elimination of this characteristic by instituting things like term limits or mandatory retirement ages.

Judges of the United States courts, for example, serve for life, but a system of incentives to retire at full pay after a given age and disqualification from leadership has been instituted. The International Olympic Committee instituted a mandatory retirement age in 1965, and Pope Paul VI removed the right of cardinals to vote for a new pope once they reached the age of 80, which was to limit the number of cardinals that would vote for the new Pope, due to the proliferation of cardinals that was occurring at the time and is continuing to occur.

Gerontocracy may emerge in an institution not initially known for it.

See also
Ageism
Cronyism
Gerontophobia
Gerousia
Lists of state leaders by age

References 

Ageing
Oligarchy
Political systems